Novaya Gazeta is a regional newspaper published in Latvia, focussing on the central Latvian town of Jelgava and the surrounding region, as well as the Russian language and culture.

References

Russian-language newspapers published in Latvia
Jelgava
1993 establishments in Latvia